Love, Lust or Run is an American reality television series which premiered on the TLC cable network, on January 30, 2014, starring fashion consultant Stacy London. During every episode of the series, Stacy London meets a different woman and helps her to work on usually very questionable fashion choices. The show follows the same format as British television series Snog Marry Avoid?. Ahead of the conclusion of the first season, TLC renewed the show for 26 additional episodes.

"I am so thrilled to have Stacy back on TLC!" said Nancy Daniels, the general manager of the network. "She has an amazing ability to connect with fashion challenged women and help them find their own sense of style.  With this new show, we definitely put Stacy's skills to the test," Daniels also added. Stacy London had previously hosted another fashion-themed show, What Not to Wear, which aired on the same network.

Series overview

References

External links 

 
 
 

2010s American reality television series
2015 American television series debuts
2016 American television series endings
American television series based on British television series
English-language television shows
Fashion-themed reality television series
Makeover reality television series
TLC (TV network) original programming